Květa Peschke and Katarina Srebotnik were the defending champions but chose not to participate.
Raquel Kops-Jones and Abigail Spears won the final 6–2, 6–4 against Vania King and Nadia Petrova.

Seeds

Draw

Draw

External links
 Main draw

Mercury Insurance Open - Doubles
2012 Doubles